Merching station is a railway station in the municipality of Merching, located in the district of Aichach-Friedberg in Swabia, Germany.

References

Railway stations in Bavaria